Tuli ja raud is a novel by Estonian author Karl Ristikivi. It was first published in 1938 by Loodus.

1938 novels
Novels by Karl Ristikivi